Eugnosta euglypta is a species of moth of the  family Tortricidae. It is found in  Rwanda and Uganda.

References

Moths described in 1927
Eugnosta